Prithibi (Bengali: পৃথিবী) is a Bengali rock band officially formed in Kolkata, India in the year 2005. But its original formation goes back to 2001 at Ashutosh College. Presently the band consists of Kaushik (lead vocals, composer, lyricist), Deep (bass, backing vocals), Arunangshu (guitar) and Aniruddha (drums, percussions & backing vocal), Deepayan (keyboard, backing vocal), Debangshu (guitar) . The band became more popular with audiences when they stood first runner up in a competition, Band-E-Mataram held in Kolkata by a music channel, Sangeet Bangla, record label Asha Audio and Sangbad Pratidin in 2005.

Genre 
Their music is a blend of various genres like classic rock, 80s glam rock, metal and Bengali rock along with modern poetical lyrics written and composed by Kaushik....!

History 
In 2001, when three Ashutosh College students, Kaushik, Abhijit and Souvik joined together to form a band, Prithibi was found. Before forming the band, three of them used to jam together at the canteen corner. Among them Kaushik was already a solo artiste and did many projects in and outside Kolkata. Meanwhile, he was also searching for a 'dologoto proyash' i.e. a band to create music.

The band experienced a flurry of line-up changes until 2005, by which time a sort of permanency was attained – Kaushik (vocals), Bubun (guitars), Prosanto (bass), Arnab (drums), Samarpan (guitars) and Amin (keyboards).

2005 was also the year when Prithibi stood first runner up in the competition 'Band-e-Mataram'.

By the end of 2007 keyboardist Amin left the band for some of his personal reasons. And followed the exit of Samarpan in 2010. And Raja joined as the new guitarist.

Their guitarist, Bubun, died on 17 November 2012. Later Sharad Diyali joined as the guitarist of the band.

References

External links 
 

Bengali people
Indian rock music groups
Indian rock musicians
Musical groups established in 2005